Raymond DeWayne Jackson (born February 17, 1973) is an American football executive who is the Vice President of Player Development for the Denver Broncos of the National Football League (NFL).. Jackson is a former American football defensive back in the National Football League. He was drafted by the Buffalo Bills in the fifth round of the 1996 NFL Draft. He played college football at Colorado State. Ray Jackson was inducted into the Colorado State Rams Hall of Fame in 2011.

Ray Jackson also played for the Cleveland Browns.

References 

1973 births
Living people
American football cornerbacks
American football safeties
Colorado State Rams football players
Buffalo Bills players
Cleveland Browns players